Mill Creek Park (officially known as Mill Creek MetroParks) is a metropolitan park located in Youngstown, Ohio. The Trust for Public Land ranks one part of Mill Creek as the 142nd largest park located within the limits of a US city.

Mill Creek MetroParks now stretches from the near west side of Youngstown to the southern borders of the city and neighboring Boardman township. The park "encompasses approximately 4400 acres (10.5 km²), 20 mi (32 km) of drives, and 15 mi (24 km) of foot trails" as well as a variety of bridges, ponds, streams, well-tended gardens, and waterfalls. If including the total size of the park system, Mill Creek ranks among the largest metropolitan-owned parks within the city limits of any US city.

History 
Mill Creek Park was founded in 1891 due to the "untiring efforts of Youngstown attorney Volney Rogers."  Rogers secured options on much of the land and was able to purchase large tracts of it. This was no small task given that he was compelled to deal with more than 90 landowners. Once the land was secured, Rogers framed and promoted what he called the "Township Park Improvement Law." Upon the law's passage, Rogers turned over all of the land he had secured for park purposes. Rogers had the area declared a park by the state legislature. It officially opened in 1893.

Rogers enlisted the help of his brother Bruce, who had studied landscape architecture and became the first park superintendent. In 1899, the project benefited from the contributions of well-known landscape architect Charles Eliot. The Olmsted Brothers firm provided extensive design work from 1923–1962.

The same year that the park opened, the Mahoning County commissioners issued bonds to pay for the parkland, and Rogers purchased $25,000 of them, with the understanding that they would be the last ones paid. Ironically, the financial panic of 1893 facilitated the park's development. As a later newspaper account observed: "Unemployed men found work there. A second bond issue paid for their wages. The men cut trails, established drives, restored Pioneer Pavilion (a renovated factory building that was the oldest structure in the park) and built Lake Cohasset Dam".

Fellows Riverside Gardens

Fellows Riverside Gardens is a free public garden located at the northern end of Mill Creek MetroParks. Its twelve acres feature a landscape of diverse and colorful plant displays, roses of all classes, seasonal displays of annuals, perennials, flowering bulbs, and scenic vistas. The  D. D. and Velma Davis Education & Visitor Center has made the Gardens an all-season destination. Fellows Riverside Gardens attracts over 400,000 visitors a year.

Mill Creek Golf Course
Mill Creek Golf Course features two 18-hole championship courses designed by Donald Ross that opened to the public in 1928. Both courses are par 70 with four sets of tees, stretching from 5095 yards to 6511 yards. The South Course plays over a flat terrain with tree-lined fairways. Natural areas and streams come into play on five holes. The South Course has been selected by Golfweek as one of America’s 30 Best Municipal Courses. The North Course weaves through tall trees and includes a variety of natural hazards.

Lanterman's Mill

Lanterman's Mill was built in 1845–46 by German Lanterman and Samuel Kimberly. Restored in 1982–85 through a gift from the Ward and Florence Beecher Foundations, this community treasure represents one of the many pioneer industries developed along Mill Creek and operates today as it did in the 1800s, grinding corn, wheat, and buckwheat.

The nearby East Gorge Walk and West Gorge Trail offer a peek into the area's geologic history. Listed in the Mid-America Walking Atlas, the award-winning Gorge Trail is a two-mile loop along Mill Creek that consists of a boardwalk bordered on one side by the stream and on the other side by a massive wall of sandstone.

Ford Nature Center
The Ford Nature Education Center opened to the public in 1972 as the headquarters for the Park’s nature education programs in the northern part of Mill Creek Park.  The education center is housed within the stone mansion donated to the Park in 1968 by the children of the late Judge John W. Ford.

A staff of naturalists at the Ford Nature Center offer a variety of programming throughout the year including hikes, school programs, workshops, and special events. Displays include the depiction of plants and animals of four local habitats, a children's interactive discovery room and a room with live turtles, snakes and other animals native to northeast Ohio.  The Center also houses a library, bird observation area, teachers’ resource center and a gift shop. The grounds include wildlife gardens and walking trails.

Lakes, ponds and wetlands

Mill Creek Park contains three man-made lakes, a pond and a wetland.

Lake Glacier
Lake Glacier was created in 1906 by the damming of Mill Creek at the "narrows" as it approached the Mahoning River. This 44-acre lake has provided recreational opportunities for many generations. Boating and fishing are permitted in season. Kayaks and pedalos are available to rent at the Glacier Boathouse on West Glacier Drive. A passenger boat is available for individual rides and group reservations. A barrier-free fishing dock is located along West Glacier Drive. Hikers can access Old Tree Trail and East Glacier Trail.

Lake Newport and wetlands
In 1924, Alice Baldwin Lewis donated 70 acres of land specifying that part of the land was to be used for creating a lake. Mill Creek meandered through this shallow valley making it a suitable site for a man-made lake. In 1928 a dam was built, creating what is now known as Lake Newport. Lake Newport, the largest of Mill Creek Park's three lakes, offers 60 acres of open water and 40 acres of wetlands. Boating and fishing are permitted in season. A boat launch is located on East Newport Drive. Kayaks and pedalos are available to rent at the Boathouse on West Newport Drive.

The Newport Wetlands, located at the southern end of the lake, provide habitat for a variety of plants and animals. Visitors can experience this complex web of flora and fauna by walking the Albert E. Davies Wetland Trail, a boardwalk through the wetlands with interpretive signs along the way.

Lake Cohasset
Lake Cohasset, the oldest of Mill Creek Park's lakes, was built in 1897 and is known for its hemlocks. The name comes from the Algonquin word "Conahasset", meaning "long rocky place". This 28-acre lake offers visitors a secluded place to view wildlife in their natural habitats. Boating and fishing are not permitted on Lake Cohasset.

Lily pond
Migrating waterfowl and resident goldfish have made this four-acre pond a popular site since 1896. The Lily Pond Circle Trail loops around the pond, providing a path for visiting recreationalists.

See also
 Mill Creek Park Suspension Bridge
 Mill Creek (disambiguation)

Notes

External links
 Official website
 Ford Nature Center
 Mill Creek Golf Course
 Fellows Riverside Gardens
 Lanterman's Mill
 Lakes & Ponds
 Mill Creek Park Suspension Bridge at bridgehunter.com
 U.S. Geological Survey Map at the U.S. Geological Survey Map Website. Retrieved November 9th, 2022.

Youngstown, Ohio
Urban public parks
Protected areas of Mahoning County, Ohio
Parks in Ohio
Nature centers in Ohio
Tourist attractions in Youngstown, Ohio